Quyqu (Aymara for a kind of instrument similar to the qina, also spelled Cuyco) is a mountain in Bolivia which reaches a height of approximately . It is located in the Potosí Department, Antonio Quijarro Province, Porco Municipality. It lies southwest of Warawara Lake.

References 

Mountains of Potosí Department